Charles Jackson, nicknamed "Slick" and "Baby", was an American Negro league pitcher between 1908 and 1911.

Jackson played for the Minneapolis Keystones from 1908 to 1910, and finished his career with the Kansas City Royal Giants in 1911. In six recorded career appearances on the mound, he posted a 3.67 ERA over 41.2 innings.

References

External links
Baseball statistics and player information from Baseball-Reference Black Baseball Stats and Seamheads

Year of birth missing
Year of death missing
Kansas City Royal Giants players
Minneapolis Keystones players